Western Thrace or West Thrace ([Dytikí] Thráki ; ; , Zapadna/Belomorska Trakiya), also known as Greek Thrace, is a geographic and historical region of Greece, between the Nestos and Evros rivers in the northeast of the country; East Thrace, which lies east of the river Evros, forms the European part of Turkey, and the area to the north, in Bulgaria, is known as Northern Thrace.

Inhabited since paleolithic times, it has been under the political, cultural and linguistic influence of the Greek world since the classical era; Greeks from the Aegean islands extensively colonized the region (especially the coastal part) and built prosperous cities such as Abdera (home of Democritus, the 5th-century B.C. philosopher who developed an atomic particle theory, and of Protagoras, a leading sophist) and Sale (near present-day Alexandroupolis). Under the Byzantine Empire, Western Thrace benefited from its position close to the imperial heartland and became a center of medieval Greek commerce and culture; later, under the Ottoman Empire, a number of Muslims settled there, marking the birth of the Muslim minority of Greece.

Topographically, Thrace alternates between mountain-enclosed basins of varying size and deeply cut river valleys. It is divided into the three regional units (former prefectures): Xanthi, Rhodope and Evros, which together with the Macedonian regional units of Drama, Kavala and Thasos form the Region of East Macedonia and Thrace.

The Fourth Army Corps of the Hellenic Army has its headquarters in Xanthi; in recent years, the region has attracted international media attention after becoming a key entering point for illegal immigrants trying to enter European Union territory; Greek security forces, working together with Frontex, are also extensively deployed in the Greco-Turkish land border.

Demographics

The approximate area of Western Thrace is 8,578 km² with a population of 371,208 according to the 2011 census. It's estimated that two-thirds (67%) of the population are Orthodox Christian Greeks, while about a third (33%) are Muslims who are an officially recognised minority of Greece. Of these, about a quarter are of Turkish origin, while another quarter are Pomaks who mainly inhabit the mountainous parts of the region. The rest are Muslim Greeks or Romani. The Romani of Thrace are also mainly Muslim, unlike their ethnic kin in other parts of the country who generally profess the Orthodox faith of the Greek majority.

Thrace is bordered by Bulgaria to the north, Turkey to the east, the Aegean Sea (Greece) to the south and the Greek region of Macedonia to the west. Alexandroupolis is the largest city, with a municipal population of 72,959 according to the 2011 census. Below is a table of the five largest Thracian cities:

History

After the Roman conquest, Western Thrace further belonged to the Roman province of Thracia founded in 46 AD. At the beginning of the 2nd AD century Roman emperor Trajan founded here, as a part of the provincial policy, two cities of Greek type (i.e. city-states), Traianoupolis and Plotinopolis. From this region passed the famous Via Egnatia, which ensured the communication between East and West, while its ramifications were connecting the Aegean world with Thracian hinterland (i.e. upper and middle valley of Evros river). From the coast also passed the sea route Troad–Macedonia, which the Apostle Paul had used in his journeys in Greece. During the great crisis of the Roman Empire in the 3rd century AD, Western Thrace suffered from the frequent incursions of the barbarians until the reign of Diocletian, when it managed to prosper again thanks to its administrative reforms.

The region had been under the rule of the Byzantine Empire from the time of the division of the Roman Empire into Eastern and Western empires in the early fourth century AD. The Ottoman Empire conquered most of the region in the 14th century and ruled it until the Balkan Wars of 1912–1913. During Ottoman rule, Thrace had a mixed population of Turks and Bulgarians, with a strong Greek element in the cities and the Aegean Sea littoral. A smaller number of Pomaks, Jews, Armenians and Romani also lived in the region. At 1821, several parts of Western Thrace, such as Lavara, Maroneia, and Samothraki rebelled and participated in the Greek War of Independence.

During the First Balkan War, the Balkan League (Serbia, Greece, Bulgaria and Montenegro) fought against the Ottoman Empire and annexed most of its European territory, including Thrace. Western Thrace was occupied by Bulgarian troops who defeated the Ottoman army. On November 15, 1912, on the right bank of the river Maritza, Macedonian-Adrianopolitan Volunteer Corps captured the Turkish corps of Yaver Paha, which defended Eastern Rhodopes and Western Thrace from invading Bulgarians.

The victors quickly fell into dispute on how to divide the newly conquered lands, resulting in the Second Balkan War. In August 1913, Bulgaria was defeated, but kept Western Thrace under the terms of the Treaty of Bucharest.

In the following years, the Central Powers (Germany, Austria-Hungary, and the Ottoman Empire), with which Bulgaria had sided, lost World War I, and as a result, Bulgaria had to surrender Western Thrace under the terms of the 1919 Treaty of Neuilly. Western Thrace was under temporary management of the Entente led by French General Charles Antoine Charpy. In late April 1920, as per the San Remo conference with gathered the leaders of the main allies of the Entente powers (except the US), Western Thrace was given to Greece.

Throughout the Balkan Wars and World War I, Bulgaria, Greece and Turkey each forced respective minority populations in the Thrace region out of areas they controlled. A large population of Greeks in Eastern Thrace, and Black Sea coastal and southern Bulgaria, was expelled south and west into Greek-controlled Thrace. Concurrently, a large population of Bulgarians was forced from the region into Bulgaria by Greek and Turkish actions. Turkish populations in the area were also targeted by Bulgarian and Greek forces and pushed eastward. As part of the Treaty of Neuilly and subsequent agreements, the status of the expelled populations was legitimized. This was followed by a further population exchange which radically changed the demographics of the region toward increased ethnic homogenization within the territories each respective country was ultimately awarded.

This was followed by the large-scale Greek-Turkish population exchanges of 1923 (Treaty of Lausanne), which finalized the reversal of Western and Eastern Thrace region's pre-Balkan War demography. The treaty granted the status of a minority to the Muslims in Western Thrace, in exchange for a similar status for the ethnic Greek minority in Istanbul and the Aegean islands of Imbros and Tenedos.

After the German invasion (April 1941), the area was occupied by Bulgarian troops, as part of the triple Axis occupation of Greece, during World War II. During this period (1941-1944) the demographic distribution was further changed, with the arrest of the region's approximately 4,500 Jews by the Bulgarian police and their deportation to death camps administered by Germany. None of them survived.

Economy

The economy of Thrace in recent years has become less dependent on agriculture. A number of Greek-owned high-tech industries belonging to the telecommunications industry have settled in the area. The Egnatia Odos motorway which passes through Thrace, has contributed to the further development of the region. Tourism is slowly becoming more and more important as the Aegean coast has a number of beaches, and there is also the potential for winter tourism activities in the Rhodopi mountains, the natural border with Bulgaria, which are covered by dense forest.

Politics

The Muslim minority of Thrace are Greek citizens of diverse ethnic origins and is recognised as religious minority in accordance with the Treaty of Lausanne which Greece has signed with Turkey, and along with the Greek Constitution, enshrines the fundamental rights of the Turks and other ethnic groups of Eastern Macedonia and Thrace and the obligations towards them. The Greek government is not referring to the Muslim minority by a specific ethnic background, as it includes Turks, Pomaks and Roma Muslims.

The minority was exempted from the 1922-1923 Exchange of populations between Greece and Turkey and was granted special rights within the framework of the Treaty of Lausanne, such as religious freedom and education in the Turkish language.

The estimated numbers of the minority's constituent ethnic groups are according to a document of the Greek Consulate in Berlin, the following:

 total number of Muslim minority is approximately 120,000
 Turkish: ~35%
 Pomaks: ~35%
 Roma people: ~15%
 ethnic Greek Muslims: ~15%

Turkey, a signatory state of the Lausanne Treaty, initially claimed the whole of the Muslim minority to be strictly an ethnic Turkish minority even though it consists of multiple ethnic groups. However, Recep Tayyip Erdoğan, during his historic December 7, 2017 visit to Greece as President of Turkey, acknowledged for the first time the multi-ethnic nature of the Muslim minority.

Historical demographics

The last censuses which asked about ethnicity were held in the transitional period before the region became part of Greece. A number of estimates and censuses during the 1912-1920 period gave the following results about the ethnic distribution of the area that would become known as Western Thrace:

The Pomak population depending on the source was sometimes counted together with the Turks (Muslims) following the Ottoman system of classifying people according to religion, while in other occasions was specified separately. According to the Bulgarian view, they are considered "Bulgarian
Muslims" and an integral part of the Bulgarian nation.

By the Bulgarian census in 1919, held on the request of the Entente, of the population of Western Thrace was 219,723 of whom: Turks 35.4% (77,726 Muslims), Bulgarians 46.3% (101,766 - 81,457 Christians and 20 309 Muslims), Greeks 14.8% (32,553 Christians), Jews 1.4% (3,066) Armenians 1.5% (2,369), others 0,9% (1,243). The area ceded to the Entente also included Karaagach and its environs, which became part of Turkey after the Treaty of Lausanne.

Western Thrace was ceded to the Entente in December 1919, after which many Bulgarians left the region, while many Greeks moved in. The Government of the Entente (led by French general Sharpe) held its own census in 1920, according to which Western Thrace had a population of 204,700, of whom: Turks 36.5% (74,720 Muslims), Bulgarians 32.2% (65,927 = 54,079 Christians and 11,848 Muslims), Greeks 27.4% (56,114 Christians), Jews 1.5% (2,985) Armenians 0.9% (1,880), others 3,066. At the time this census was conducted, a part of the Greek population of Ksanthi, who left massively the Ksanthi district after the Balkan wars (1913), returned.

According to the Turkish researches the population of Western Thrace in 1923 was 191,699, of whom 129,120 (67%) were Turks/Muslims (also includes the Pomaks) and 33,910 (18%) were Greeks; the remaining 28,669 (15%) were mostly (Christian) Bulgarians, along with small numbers of Jews and Armenians (before the population exchange).

The population of the region, according to the official census of 1928 and 1951 conducted by the local authorities, per mother tongue, was as follows:

Miscellaneous

Abdera, an ancient Greek coastal town in the regional unit of Xanthi is the birthplace of the Greek philosophers Democritus, considered by some the father of the atomic theory, and Protagoras, who is credited with having invented the role of the professional sophist or teacher of "virtue".
Thrace and in particular the Rhodope mountains, its northern mountainous part, is home to one of the two surviving brown bear (species Ursus arctos) populations in Greece (the other is in the Pindus mountains, in central Greece).
The Greek-Turkish border is a major entering point of illegal immigrants from Asia (Syrians, Kurds, Afghans, Pakistanis) trying to enter Europe.

See also
 Northern Thrace
 Eastern Thrace
 Thrace
 Thracians
 List of Thracian Greeks
 Turks of Western Thrace
 Pomaks
 Muslim minority of Greece
 Provisional Government of Western Thrace
 Eastern Macedonia and Thrace
 Democritus University of Thrace
 The Holocaust in Bulgarian-occupied Greece

References

Bibliography

.

External links

Region of Eastern Macedonia and Thrace 
Combined Prefectural Authority of Drama, Kavala and Xanthi
Combined Prefectural Authority of Rhodope and Evros
Prefecture of Xanthi
Thrakiki.gr
Prefecture of Rhodope
Prefecture of Evros
Democritus University of Thrace
Municipality of Feres

 
Northern Greece